Sydney Harrington (1926–2005), was a male weightlifter who competed for England.

Weightlifting career
He represented Great Britain in weightlifting at the 1956 Summer Olympics.

He represented England in the 82.5 kg Combined division at the 1954 British Empire and Commonwealth Games in Vancouver, Canada.

References

1926 births
2005 deaths
English male weightlifters
Olympic weightlifters of Great Britain
Weightlifters at the 1956 Summer Olympics
Weightlifters at the 1954 British Empire and Commonwealth Games
Commonwealth Games competitors for England
20th-century English people